Jace or Jase is a masculine given name, often a shortened version of Jason, and more rarely a surname. It is also an acronym commonly used in building automation and heating, ventilation, and air conditioning which stands for "Java Automated Control Engine".

People
Jace (artist), French graffiti artist

Given name
Jace Alexander (born 1964), American television director and actor
Jace Amaro (born 1992), American football player
Jace Billingsley (born 1993), American football player
Jace Bode (born 1987), Australian rules footballer 
Jase Bolger (born 1971), American politician
Jace Bugg (1976–2003), American golfer
Jace Chan (born 1994), Hong Kong singer
Jace Clark (born 2005), American soccer player
Jase Coburn (born 1983), American basketball coach
Jace Daniels (born 1989), American football player
Jase Daniels (born 1982), American linguist
Jace Denmark (born 2004), American racing driver
Jace Everett (born 1972), American singer
Jace Flores (born 1988), Filipino actor
Jace Fry (born 1993), American Baseball player
Jace Hall (born 1971), American film producer
Jace Jung (born 2000), American baseball player
Jace Kotsopoulos (born 1997), Canadian soccer player
Jace Lasek, Canadian musician and producer
Jace Miller, American poet
Jace Norman (born 2000), American actor
Jace Peterson (born 1990), American baseball player
Jace Richdale, American television producer
Jase Robertson (born 1969), American television personality
Jace Sayler (born 1979), American football player
Jace Sternberger (born 1997), American football player
Jace Van Dijk (born 1981), Australian rugby league player
Jace Whittaker (born 1995), American football player

Surname
April Jace (1974–2014), American sprinter, wife of Michael Jace
Michael Jace (born 1965), American actor convicted of murdering his wife

Fictional characters
Jace Corso, one of the main characters in the science fiction television series Dark Matter
Jase Dyer, on the soap opera EastEnders
Helga Jace, in the comic book series DC Comics
Jace Fox, in the comic book series DC Comics
Jace Herondale, one of the main characters of The Shadowhunter Chronicles

See also
Jayce, given name

Masculine given names
English masculine given names
Hypocorisms